The National Government of 1937–1939 was formed by Neville Chamberlain on his appointment as Prime Minister of the United Kingdom by King George VI. He succeeded Stanley Baldwin, who announced his resignation following the coronation of the King and Queen in May 1937.

As a National Government it contained members of the Conservative Party, Liberal Nationals and National Labour, as well as a number of individuals who belonged to no political party. In September 1939, Chamberlain requested the formal resignations of all his colleagues, reconstructing the government in order to better confront Nazi Germany in the Second World War.

Policies

Foreign policy

Chamberlain is best known for his appeasement policy, and in particular for his signing of the Munich Agreement in 1938, conceding the Sudetenland region of Czechoslovakia to Germany. He said it brought "peace in our time" and was widely applauded. He also stepped up Britain's rearmament program, and worked closely with France. When in 1939 Hitler continued his aggression, taking over the rest of Czechoslovakia and threatening Poland, Chamberlain pledged to defend Poland's independence if the latter were attacked. Britain and France declared war when Germany attacked Poland in September 1939.

Domestic policies
Chamberlain wanted to focus on domestic issues. He obtained passage of the Factories Act 1937, designed to better working conditions in factories, and placed limits on the working hours of women and children. The Coal Act 1938 allowed for nationalisation of coal deposits. Another major piece of legislation passed that year was the Holidays with Pay Act 1938.  The Housing Act 1938 provided subsidies aimed at encouraging slum clearance, and maintained rent control. Chamberlain's plans for the reform of local government were shelved because of the outbreak of war in 1939. Likewise, the proposal to raise the school-leaving age to 15, scheduled for implementation on 1 September 1939, could not go into effect.

Cabinet

May 1937 – September 1939
Neville Chamberlain – Prime Minister and Leader of the House of Commons
The Viscount Hailsham – Lord High Chancellor of Great Britain
The Viscount Halifax – Leader of the House of Lords and Lord President of the Council 
The Earl De La Warr – Lord Keeper of the Privy Seal
Sir John Simon – Chancellor of the Exchequer
Sir Samuel Hoare – Secretary of State for the Home Department
Anthony Eden – Secretary of State for Foreign Affairs
William Ormsby-Gore – Secretary of State for the Colonies
Malcolm MacDonald – Secretary of State for Dominion Affairs
Leslie Hore-Belisha – Secretary of State for War
The Marquess of Zetland – Secretary of State for India and Burma
The Viscount Swinton – Secretary of State for Air
Walter Elliot – Secretary of State for Scotland
Duff Cooper – First Lord of the Admiralty
Oliver Stanley – President of the Board of Trade
The Earl Stanhope – President of the Board of Education
William Shepherd Morrison – Minister of Agriculture
Ernest Brown – Minister of Labour
Sir Kingsley Wood – Minister of Health
Leslie Burgin – Minister of Transport
Sir Thomas Inskip – Minister for Coordination of Defence

For a full list of ministerial office-holders, see National Government 1935-1940.

Key office holders not in the Cabinet
The Earl Winterton – Chancellor of the Duchy of Lancaster
The Lord Hutchison – Paymaster-General
Herwald Ramsbotham – Minister of Pensions
George Tryon – Postmaster General
Sir Philip Sassoon – First Commissioner of Works
Sir Donald Somervell – Attorney General
Sir Terence O'Connor – Solicitor General
David Margesson – Chief Whip
Osmund Somers Cleverly – Principal Private Secretary to the Prime Minister

Changes
February 1938 – Lord Halifax succeeds Eden as Foreign Secretary. Halifax is succeeded as Lord President by Lord Hailsham, who is succeeded as Lord Chancellor by Lord Maugham. Halifax is succeeded as Leader of the House of Lords by Lord Stanhope, who remains President of the Board of Education as well.
March 1938 – Lord Winterton, the Chancellor of the Duchy of Lancaster, enters the Cabinet.
May 1938 – Orsmby-Gore inherits the title Baron Harlech. He subsequently steps down from the government and is succeeded by Malcolm MacDonald as Colonial Secretary. Lord Stanley succeeds MacDonald as Dominions Secretary. Kingsley Wood succeeds Lord Swinton as Secretary of State for Air. Walter Elliot succeeds Wood as Minister of Health. John Colville succeeds Elliot as Scottish Secretary.
June 1938 – The Earl of Munster succeeds Lord Hutchison as Paymaster-General.
October 1938 – Lord Stanhope succeeds Duff Cooper (resigned) as First Lord of the Admiralty, remaining also Leader of the House of Lords. Lord De La Warr succeeds Stanhope at the Board of Education. Sir John Anderson succeeds De La Warr as Lord Privy Seal, with special responsibility for Air Raid Precautions. Malcolm MacDonald succeeds Stanley (deceased) as Dominions Secretary, remaining also Colonial Secretary. Lord Runciman succeeds Lord Hailsham as Lord President.
January 1939 – Sir Thomas Inskip succeeds Malcolm MacDonald as Dominions Secretary. MacDonald remains Colonial Secretary. Lord Chatfield succeeds Inskip as Minister for Coordination of Defence. William Morrison succeeds Lord Winterton at the Duchy of Lancaster, who becomes Paymaster-General outside the Cabinet. Sir Reginald Dorman-Smith succeeds Morrison as Minister of Agriculture. Lord Winterton leaves the Cabinet and the post of Chancellor of the Duchy of Lancaster, becoming Paymaster-General in succession to the Earl of Munster.
April 1939 – Leslie Burgin becomes Minister without Portfolio pending the legislation to create the Ministry of Supply. He is succeeded as Minister of Transport by Euan Wallace.
June 1939 – Herwald Ramsbotham succeeds Sir Philip Sassoon (deceased) as First Commissioner of Works and is succeeded as Minister of Pensions by Sir Walter Womersley.
July 1939 – Leslie Burgin becomes Minister of Supply.

List of ministers
Members of the Cabinet are in bold face.

Notes

References

Bibliography

Secondary sources
 Butler, David, and Butler, G. Twentieth Century British Political Facts 1900–2000
 Cowling, Maurice. The Impact of Hitler: British Politics and British Policy, 1933–1940 (Cambridge University Press, 1975).
 Feiling, Keith. A Life of Neville Chamberlain (London: Macmillan, 1970)
 Macklin, Graham. Chamberlain (Haus Books, 2006) 
 Mowat, Charles Loch. Britain between the Wars: 1918–1945 (1955), pp. 413–79
 Raymond, John, ed. The Baldwin Age (1960), essays by scholars 252 pages; online 
 Roberts, Andrew. 'The Holy Fox': The Life of Lord Halifax (1997).
 Self, Robert C. Neville Chamberlain: A Biography (2006) excerpt and text search
 Smart, Nick.  The National Government. 1931–40 (Macmillan 1999) 
 Taylor, A. J. P. English History 1914–1945 (1965), pp. 321–88
 Thorpe, Andrew. Britain in the 1930s. The Deceptive Decade, (Oxford: Blackwell, 1992).

Primary sources
 Chamberlain, Neville. The Neville Chamberlain Diary Letters: The Downing Street Years, 1934–1940 edited by Robert Self (2005)

1930s in the United Kingdom
1937 establishments in the United Kingdom
1939 disestablishments in the United Kingdom
British ministries
Cabinets disestablished in 1939
Cabinets established in 1937
Coalition governments of the United Kingdom
Interwar Britain
 
Ministries of George VI
Ministry 1